John Caesar (1764 – 15 February 1796), nicknamed "Black Caesar", was the first Australian bushranger and one of the first people of African descent to arrive in Australia.

Biography
It is believed that Caesar was born in Madagascar or the West Indies. He moved to England and was a servant living in the parish of St Paul, Deptford, England, in 1786.

Transportation to Australia
On 17 March 1786, he was tried at Maidstone, Kent for stealing 240 shillings. His sentence was transportation to the penal colony of New South Wales for seven years. His occupation was listed as servant or labourer.

Alexander arrived in Botany Bay in January 1788.

According to the Australian Dictionary of Biography, Caesar gained a reputation in the colony as a conscientious and hard worker.

First escape
On 29 April 1789 he was tried for theft and sentenced to a second term of transportation, this time to life.

Caesar took to the bush a fortnight later, reportedly with some provisions, an iron pot, and a musket stolen from a marine named Abraham Hand. However, unable to sustain himself owing to the shortage of game, he began to steal food on the outskirts of the settlement.

On 26 May he helped himself to a brickmaking gang's rations on Brickfield Hill and was nearly caught. On the night of 6 June he tried to steal food from the house of Zachariah Clark, the colony's assistant commissary for stores, and was caught by a convict named William Saltmarsh.

In July 1789, David Collins, the colony's Judge-Advocate, wrote: This man was always reputed the hardest living convict in the colony; his frame was muscular and well calculated for hard labour; but in his intellects he did not very widely differ from a brute; his appetite was ravenous, for he would in any one day devour the full rations for two days. To gratify this appetite he was compelled to steal from others, and all his thefts were directed to that purpose.

Caesar was described by Collins after his first recapture as a "wretch" who was "so indifferent about meeting death, that he declared while in confinement, that if he should be hanged, he would create a laugh before he was turned off, by playing off some trick upon the executioner". Governor Arthur Phillip however, took advantage of Caesar's potential as a labourer and had him sent to Garden Island, where he would work in fetters and be provided with vegetables. There he showed good behaviour and as a result was eventually allowed to work without iron belts.

Second escape
Caesar was allowed to work without chains. On 22 December 1789 he escaped in a stolen canoe, taking a gun. He robbed settlers' gardens, and stole from local Aboriginals, who speared him on 30 January 1790.

On 31 January 1790 Caesar handed himself in to camp.

Governor Phillip pardoned him and sent Caesar in the Supply to Norfolk Island in March 1790 to assist Doctor Considen. According to his biography, "By 1 July 1791 he was supporting himself on a lot at Queenborough and was issued with a hog. In January next year he was given one acre (0.4 ha) and ordered to work three days a week."

Caesar became a father, having a daughter with fellow convict Anne Power (d 1796). Mary Ann Power was born on 4 March 1792. Caesar left her on Norfolk Island when he returned to Port Jackson in the Kitty in 1793.

Third escape
Caesar escaped briefly again in July 1794 but soon returned home.

Pemulwuy
Caesar gained some notoriety during his lifetime for his part in wounding the Aboriginal warrior Pemulwuy. He was working with a party at Botany Bay in late 1795 that came under attack by a group of warriors led by Pemulwuy. Caesar wounded him by cracking his skull.

During his many skirmishes with European settlers, Pemulwuy is rumored to have been wounded up to seven times, with Caesar being one of the many men to almost end his leadership of the Aboriginal resistance to the European colonisation of Australia.

Fourth escape
Caesar escaped from custody in December 1795 and led a gang of absconders in the Port Jackson area. Settlers were warned against supplying him with ammunition.

On 29 January 1796 Governor Hunter offered a reward for his capture of five gallons of spirits.

Death
On 15 February 1796 John Wimbow and another man tracked Caesar down at Liberty Plains. Caesar fired at them but Wimbrow managed to wound him. Caesar was taken to the hut of Thomas Rose where he died of his wounds.

He was survived by his daughter, Mary Ann Fisher Power.

See also
List of convicts transported to Australia
African Australians

References

External links
 The first bushranger
 University of Wollongong First Fleet educational website
 JOHN CAESAR (alias Black Caesar)

Australian outlaws
Bushrangers
Convicts transported to Australia on the First Fleet
1764 births
1796 deaths
Deaths by firearm in New South Wales
Australian people of Malagasy descent
Convict escapees in Australia